Julien Alex Thomas Faubert (born 1 August 1983) is a professional footballer who represented both France and Martinique internationally. He plays as a right winger or midfielder.

Faubert started his footballing career in France with Cannes before moving to Bordeaux. In 2007, he moved to England to play for West Ham. In 2009, he spent a short period on loan with Real Madrid before returning to West Ham for the beginning of the 2009–10 season. He has represented both France U21 and France, the latter on only one occasion, scoring one goal. In 2014, he made his international debut for Martinique. He is nicknamed " Le TGV " or "The Express Train" from his time in French football.

Club career

Cannes and Bordeaux
Born in Le Havre, Faubert enrolled in the Cannes academy in 1998 and began his career as a right back, but with his crossing ability quickly became a right winger as well as playing in a midfield role. He made his Cannes first team debut in the 2002–03 season. He steadily earned notoriety as an important member of the squad and eventually caught the eye of several Ligue 1 sides. Bordeaux signed him in 2004, with whom he played in 96 league matches, as well as in the UEFA Champions League.

West Ham United

On 23 June 2007, it was reported in French sports newspaper L'Équipe that Faubert was on the verge of a €6.5 million (£4.3 million) transfer to Rangers. On 1 July, however, he was signed by West Ham United for £6.1 million on a five-year contract. He suffered a ruptured achilles tendon during a pre-season friendly on 17 July against Czech side Sigma Olomouc, which was expected to take six months to heal. As part of his comeback, Faubert turned out for the reserves against Aston Villa's reserve team in January 2008. He finally made his first team debut for the Hammers as a late substitute against Fulham at Boleyn Ground on 12 January 2008. His first season in English football was marked by continuing injury and he made only eight appearances in the league and FA Cup.

On loan to Real Madrid
Faubert was given permission to speak to Real Madrid on 30 January 2009, with the move being completed on 31 January when he signed on loan until the end of the 2008–09 season for a reported fee of £1.5 million with an option for Real to purchase him on a three-year contract for an undisclosed fee. Faubert made his Real Madrid debut on 7 February 2009 in a 1–0 win against Racing de Santander. During his loan with Real Madrid, he missed training when he mistakenly thought he had the day off. His loan spell finished with only two appearances.

Return to West Ham

Faubert enjoyed a fine start to the 2009–10 season, helping the Hammers to victories over Wolverhampton Wanderers and Millwall and an impressive goalless draw at Blackburn Rovers. The 2009–10 season saw a change in fortunes for the Frenchman. He turned in several impressive performances, particularly in the second half of the season. He set up Carlton Cole with a measured cross for the second goal in a 2–0 win against Birmingham City. Faubert scored his first goal for the club on his 50th league game for the claret and blue against Hull City on 20 February 2010. He also added an assist in that game, producing a through ball, which Carlton Cole latched on to and dispatched accordingly. His sublime cross set up Ilan for an equalising goal against Everton on 4 April 2010. The Hammers were experiencing a poor run of form at the time. Faubert capped an accomplished season by winning the best 'Performance Of The Season' for his match-winning display against Hull. He was also awarded the SBOBET Player of the Month for August.

The 2010–11 season proved less successful for Faubert. He started the season playing on the right wing, reverting to right-back. On the last day of the summer 2011 transfer window, the Hammers recruited Blackburn Rovers full-back Lars Jacobsen who was preferred throughout the majority of the season. After the turn of the year, Faubert was in and out of the side. He did not help his chances of being selected when he left the stadium after learning he was not in the squad to face Birmingham City.

At the start of the 2011–12 season, Faubert was expected to leave the club after their relegation to the Championship. A tight hamstring ruled him out of the opening two games of the season but he made his first appearance on 16 August in an away match against Watford. Faubert came on as a 72-minute substitute, providing the assist for Scott Parker's goal to make it 4–0. During the rest of the season, he was West Ham's first choice right back and played a full part in West Ham's subsequent promotion. In May 2012, Faubert was released by West Ham due to the expiry of his contract. He played 121 games in all competitions for West Ham, scoring twice.

Elazığspor
On 27 June 2012, Faubert was officially signed by Elazığspor of the Turkish Süper Lig on a three-year contract.

Return to Bordeaux
After being released by Elazığspor, Faubert signed for his old club Bordeaux as a free agent on the transfer deadline day in January 2013, signing a contract that would keep him there until the end of the 2012–13 season. He was given squad number 22 due to his old number 18 was occupied by Jaroslav Plašil. Prior the move, Faubert asked his old club to train to maintain his fitness. Faubert made his first appearance at Bordeaux, coming on as a late substitute, as Bordeaux won 2–0 against Valenciennes. On 4 December 2013, Faubert scored in a 1–0 win over Guingamp.

Kilmarnock
After a trial period with St Johnstone during February 2016, Faubert signed for Kilmarnock until the end of the 2015–16 season. On 23 May 2016, he was one of six players released at the end of their contract.

Inter Turku 
Faubert signed for Finnish Veikkausliiga side FC Inter Turku on a one-year contract on 17 January 2017.

Borneo 
In January 2018, Faubert signed for Indonesian club Borneo in time for the 2018 Liga 1 season. In July 2018, Faubert was released by Borneo.

Étoile Fréjus Saint-Raphaël 
In June 2019, Faubert accepted the role of player-assistant manager of Championnat National 2 club Étoile Fréjus Saint-Raphaël. He departed the role in January 2020.

International career
Faubert made his debut for France on 16 August 2006 against Bosnia and Herzegovina. He wore the number 10 shirt, the first player to do so for France since the retirement of Zinedine Zidane. He marked his first match by scoring in the final minute of the game to ensure France won 2–1. Despite never receiving another call-up since then, Faubert has frequently stated his desire to return to the international scene with France.

In an interview with L'Équipe published on 24 December 2009, Faubert said that he was approached by the Algerian Football Federation (FAF) about representing the country due to his wife being Algerian. He said he would consider the option if he fails to get recalled by Les Bleus. Two days later, however, Algerian head coach Rabah Saadane denied that the FAF had made any contact with Faubert.

In October 2014, Faubert made his international debut for Martinique. Playing a 2014 Caribbean Cup qualification game against Curaçao, Faubert scored in a 1–1 draw, netting two braces in the following matches against Guadeloupe and Saint Vincent and the Grenadines.

Personal life
Faubert is of Martiniquais descent and is married to a woman of Algerian descent. He is a devout Muslim, having converted to his wife's faith. He has the word "Allah" tattooed on his forearm.

Career statistics

Club

International

International goals for France
Scores and results list France's goal tally first.

International goals for Martinique
Scores and results list Martinique's goal tally first.

Honours
Bordeaux
Coupe de la Ligue: 2006–07
Coupe de France: 2012–13

West Ham United
Football League Championship play-offs: 2012

References

External links

Julien Faubert – French league stats at lfp.fr 
Premier League profile
What happened to Julien Faubert? at Realmadridnews.com

1983 births
Living people
Footballers from Le Havre
French footballers
French expatriate footballers
French expatriate sportspeople in Spain
France under-21 international footballers
France international footballers
Martiniquais footballers
Martinique international footballers
AS Cannes players
FC Girondins de Bordeaux players
West Ham United F.C. players
Real Madrid CF players
Elazığspor footballers
Kilmarnock F.C. players
FC Inter Turku players
Borneo F.C. players
ÉFC Fréjus Saint-Raphaël players
Ligue 1 players
Premier League players
English Football League players
La Liga players
Süper Lig players
Scottish Professional Football League players
Expatriate footballers in Spain
Expatriate footballers in England
French people of Martiniquais descent
Expatriate footballers in Turkey
Expatriate footballers in Scotland
Expatriate footballers in Finland
Expatriate footballers in Indonesia
Converts to Islam
French Muslims
Dual internationalists (football)
2014 Caribbean Cup players
Association football wingers
Association football fullbacks
Veikkausliiga players
Championnat National players
Championnat National 2 players
Liga 1 (Indonesia) players